Klinkenberg may refer to

Villages in the Netherlands
 Klinkenberg (Gelderland)
 Klinkenberg (South Holland)

People
 Dirk Klinkenberg (1709-1799), Dutch astronomer
 Jean-Marie Klinkenberg (born 1944), Belgian linguist and semiotician
 Jeff Klinkenberg, Florida newspaper reporter and author
 Karel Klinkenberg (1852-1924), Dutch painter

 Other uses
Comet C/1743 X1, occasionally referred to as Comet Klinkenberg or Comet Klinkenberg-de Chéseaux
 Asteroid 10427 Klinkenberg (2017 P-L), discovered by Dirk Klinkenberg
 Klinkenberg correction, in petroleum engineering

Dutch-language surnames